The 1943 Peterborough by-election was held on 15 October 1943.  The byelection was held due to the appointment as Governor of Bermuda of the incumbent Conservative MP, David Cecil.  It was won by the Conservative candidate John Hely-Hutchinson.

References

1943 in England
Politics of Peterborough
1943 elections in the United Kingdom
By-elections to the Parliament of the United Kingdom in Cambridgeshire constituencies
20th century in Cambridgeshire